The Azerbaijan First Division is the second highest professional division in Azerbaijani professional football. The division is run by AFFA. No teams are promoted to Premier Division.

History
Due to the dissolution of the Soviet Union, all Azerbaijan clubs of the former Soviet Premier Division and Soviet First Division conformed a single Azerbaijan Premier League, which meant that the new second tier of Azerbaijan football would remain regionalized. For the first two seasons three regional groups conformed the second tier, until in 1994 the single table in use today began to be used.

Competition format
The First Division currently consists of 14 teams. All teams play each other two times.

Media coverage
CBC Sport currently own all the rights to broadcast the season's games on terrestrial TV. In Azerbaijan, the First Division games is also available on CBC Sport.

Winners

Performance by club

Records

Club records

Most consecutive wins: Absheron, 23, 2010-11
Most points in a season: Absheron, 72 points, 2010-11
Most unbeaten run: Absheron, 26 games, 2010-11

See also
 Azerbaijan Premier League
 Azerbaijan Regional League
 AFFA Amateur League
 Azerbaijan Cup
 Football in Azerbaijan

References

External links
  AFFA
  PFL
 Azerbaijan First Division seasons (Footballfacts.ru)

 
Second level football leagues in Europe
1992 establishments in Azerbaijan
2